The Milwaukee Clarks were a professional ice hockey team in Milwaukee, Wisconsin.  They were a member of the International Hockey League in 1948–1949 and the Eastern Amateur Hockey League in 1949–1950.

The Clarks were sponsored by Clark's Super Gas service stations, and took their team colors and logo directly from the oil company.

Season-by-season results

External links 
1948-49 Milwaukee Clarks player statistics (IHL)
1949-50 Milwaukee Clarks player statistics (EHL)

International Hockey League (1945–2001) teams
Sports in Milwaukee
Eastern Hockey League teams
Defunct ice hockey teams in the United States
Ice hockey clubs established in 1948
Ice hockey clubs disestablished in 1950
Ice hockey teams in Wisconsin
1948 establishments in Wisconsin
1950 disestablishments in Wisconsin